Rakesh Sinha is a nominated member of the Rajya Sabha, the upper house of the Parliament of India.

He was serving as a member of the Tirumala Tirupati Devasthanams Trust Board (2019-2021) and is also a member of the Parliamentary Committee on Home affairs. He has authored several books including a biography of Rashtriya Swayamsevak Sangh founder K. B. Hedgewar. He is a professor at the Motilal Nehru College (Eve.) University of Delhi.

He has frequently appeared in debates on national news channels. His expertise and work on the Rashtriya Swayamsevak Sangh (RSS) has established him as an RSS ideologue within the Indian culture. He is a believer of cultural nationalism and is affiliated to the right-wing politics of the country. He has also criticised neo-liberal ideas at various forums. Recently he has also demanded the imposition of President's rule in Delhi.

He was presented the Deendayal Upadhyay award by President Pranab Mukherjee on 30 May. He donated the entire amount of the prize money for social cause.

Early life and education
Sinha was born on 5 September 1964 in village Manserpur in Begusarai district of Bihar to parents Late Shri Bangali Singh and Late Shrimati Draupadi Devi. His father was a freedom fighter. He did his schooling from Netarhat Vidyalaya. He recently supported the statement of RSS chief which claimed that mob lynching was a foreign concept as Indian history does not mention any punishment for it. Sinha writes columns for newspapers such as The Indian Express. In one such article written in The Indian Express, Sinha stated that the formation of the RSS was a response to the cultural aggression against indigenous people, Indian knowledge traditions and spirituality that India witnessed in the Mughal and British periods. Also, he made his stand clear on new National Education Policy (NEP) by stating that it does not impose Hindi but only proposes to teach the children in their mother tongue.

Sinha pursued his BA (Hons), MA and PhD in political science from the University of Delhi where he was a gold medalist. He has also been an associate professor at the University of Delhi. He studied his M Phil on civil liberties movement (particularly those originating from Andhra Pradesh) and later pursued his PhD research on the organisational and ideological transformation of the Communist Party of India (Marxist).

Economic beliefs
Sinha believes that India has been hurt by the neoliberal economic reforms. According to him, India took a decisive turn for the worse with the advent of economic liberalisation in 1991, and Prime Minister Narendra Modi's demonetisation policy is the first economic battle for the "truth". In his own words, "black money took off with the neoliberal turn to the Indian economy in 1991." He has also favored FCRA amendments and stated that it protect the country against "foreign capital and foreign interest groups".

Political career
Sinha is a nominated member of Rajya Sabha, the Upper House of the Parliament of India, since July 2018. Sinha was also ICSSR Nominee to CSDS, Delhi. In March 2020, Rakesh Sinha has also given a notice, seeking the chairman's (of Rajya Sabha) permission to move the resolution to drop the word "socialist" during the time allotted for Private Members' Bill in March 2020. Recently, Sinha has also criticised Romila Thapar, stating that historians like her have "undervalued and consciously rejected many of the achievements of ancient India". He further stated that she was guided by Marxism and had a Eurocentric view.

Private member bills
Sinha has introduced 3 private member bills: population control, terminated employees welfare bill, public registry credit bill (to protect data). The Terminated Employees (Welfare) Bill 2020 was introduced on 7 February 2020, with the intension of resolving the policy of employees being laid off due to change in management policies or the Government policies or due to the losses incurred as a result of an inefficient management. The Public Credit Registry of India Bill, 2019 was introduced on 6 December 2019 with an objective to create a Public Credit Registry (i.e. a single data repository) where information on borrowings from banks, non-banking financial companies (NBFCs), corporate bonds or debentures from the market, external commercial borrowings (ECBs), foreign currency convertible bonds (FCCBs), Masala bonds, and inter-corporate borrowings can be available.

Village development and women's safety

Sinha adopted Kongthong village (located in East Khasi Hills, Meghalaya) in August 2020. He further announced adoption of another three villages (Mawmang, Mawsohmad and Sder) adjoining Kongthong in September 2021 with an objective of sustainable development, upscaling livelihoods and improving the income of people  He has gifted modern toilets and sanitary pads vending machine to Kongthong village.

Other positions
Sinha has also been nominated to several social, educational and cultural bodies like Member, Anjuman (Court) of Jamia Millia Islamia University; Member, General Assembly of the Indian Council for Cultural Relations and Member, Court of North-Eastern Hill University.

Works
As author:
Terrorism and the Indian media : a comparative study of the approach of English, Hindi, and Urdu newspapers towards terrorism, New Delhi : India Policy Foundation, 2009, 163 p.
Deceptive equality : deconstructing the equal opportunity commission, New Delhi : India Policy Foundation, 2009, 70 p.
Hole in the bucket : examining Prevention of Communal & Targeted Violence Bill-2011, New Delhi : India Policy Foundation, 2011, 29 p.
Dr. Keshav Baliram Hedgewar, New Delhi : Publication Division, Ministry of Information and Broadcasting, Government of India, 2015, 220 p.
Swaraj in ideas : quest for decolonisation of the Indian mind, New Delhi : India Policy Foundation, 2017, 42 p.
Understanding RSS, New Delhi : Har-Anand Publications Pvt Ltd, 2019, 228 p.
As editor:
Secular India : politics of minorityism, New Delhi : Vitasta Publishing Pvt. Ltd., 2012, 250 p. Contributed articles by different authors edited by Sinha. 
Is Hindu a dying race : a social and political perspective of Hindu reformers of early 20th century, New Delhi : Kautilya Books, 2016, 291 p. Three essays by Col. U.N. Mukherji, Swami Shraddhananda and  R.B. Lalchand.
Communal fascism : the siege of Bengal's culture and plurality, New Delhi : India Policy Foundation, 2017, 50 p.

In the book Understanding RSS, he dispels propaganda "intentionally weaved by pseudo intellectuals about RSS for decades".

References

Living people
Nominated members of the Rajya Sabha
Delhi University alumni
Hindu revivalist writers
1964 births